Louise Portal (born May 12, 1950) is a Canadian actress, film director, singer and writer. She won the Genie Award for Best Supporting Actress for her role in the film The Decline of the American Empire, and was a nominee for Best Actress for Sous-sol (Not Me!).

Career 
Her other film roles have included Full Blast, Séraphin: Heart of Stone (Séraphin: un homme et son péché), The Barbarian Invasions (Les Invasions barbares), The Five of Us (Elles étaient cinq), The Happiness of Others (Le Bonheur des autres), Adrien (Le Garagiste), Paul à Québec, The Orphan Muses (Les Muses orphelines), Les Salopes, or the Naturally Wanton Pleasure of Skin and Cordélia.

Personal life 
Portal was born in Chicoutimi, Quebec. Her twin sister Pauline Lapointe (died 2010) was also an actress.

Filmography

Film

Television

References

External links 
 

1950 births
Canadian film actresses
Canadian television actresses
Best Supporting Actress Genie and Canadian Screen Award winners
Musicians from Saguenay, Quebec
French Quebecers
Living people
Actresses from Quebec
French-language singers of Canada
Canadian women singers
Singers from Quebec
Canadian twins